The Gatti Mudalis were rulers based in Taramangalam, India, in the 17th century.

References

History of Tamil Nadu